Welkom Mines Recreation Ground is a multi purpose stadium in Welkom, Free State. The ground is mostly used for local cricket matches. It also hosted three first-class matches between 1954 and 1963 as the home ground for the Orange Free State cricket team, the first being a loss to the Transvaal cricket team by nine wickets on November 26, 27 and 29; 1954 as a part of the 1954/55 Currie Cup.

References

External links
 cricketarchive
 cricinfo

Sports venues in the Free State (province)
Multi-purpose stadiums in South Africa
Cricket grounds in South Africa
Matjhabeng Local Municipality